Murder in Wyoming constitutes the intentional killing, under circumstances defined by law, of people within or under the jurisdiction of the U.S. state of Wyoming.

The United States Centers for Disease Control and Prevention reported that in the year 2020, the state had a murder rate well below the median for the entire country.

Felony murder rule
For the felony murder rule in all U.S. jurisdictions, see felony murder rule.

In the state of Wyoming the common law felony murder rule is codified at W.S. 6-2-101(a). This rule provides that anyone who kills another human being during the perpetration or attempted perpetration of a sexual assault, arson, robbery, burglary, escape, resisting arrest, or kidnapping is guilty of first degree murder. The Wyoming Supreme Court has clarified this by stating that the intent necessary to be convicted under the felony murder rule is only the intent that is necessary for the underlying crime.

Penalties
Source:

References

This open draft remains in progress as of February 15, 2022.

U.S. state criminal law
Wyoming law
Murder in Wyoming